A jamb statue is a figure carved on the jambs of a doorway or window. These statues are often human figures-typically religious figures or secular or ecclesiastical leaders. Jambs are usually a part of a portal, accompanied by lintel and trumeau.

Two commonly known examples of jamb statues are the ones in Chartres Cathedral and those in Reims Cathedral; both locations are in France.

References

Architectural sculpture